Sean Rainbird (born March 1959) is a British art historian and museum director. From April 2012 he has been Director of the National Gallery of Ireland. In 2022 Caroline Campbell was appointed as new director.

Early life and education 
Rainbird was born in Hong Kong. His parents, both originally from England, lived and worked there from 1956 to 1972, when the family returned to the United Kingdom. Rainbird studied art history and German at University College London (1979-1984) before gaining a piano teaching diploma in 1996 and a diploma in management administration from Kingston University in 2001.

Career 
Rainbird was Curator, then Senior Curator at Tate (1987-2006). From November 2006 to March 2012 he was Director of the Staatsgalerie Stuttgart, succeeding Dr Christian von Holst and becoming the first non-German native speaker to lead a major German museum.

Selected works 
 Rainbird, Sean (ed). (2003). Max Beckmann. London: Tate Publishing.  
 Rainbird, Sean (2005). Joseph Beuys and the Celtic World: Scotland, Ireland and England 1970-85. London: Tate Publishing. 
 Rainbird, Sean (ed). (2015), Sean Scully, National Gallery of Ireland.

References 

1959 births
British art historians
Living people
Alumni of University College London
Museum people from Dublin (city)